James Arthur David Hope, Baron Hope of Craighead,  (born 27 June 1938) is a retired Scottish judge who served as the first Deputy President of the Supreme Court of the United Kingdom from 2009 until his retirement in 2013, having previously been the Second Senior Lord of Appeal in Ordinary. He served as Convenor of the Crossbench peers in the House of Lords from 2015 to 2019.

Early life
A descendant of Charles Hope, Lord Granton, Lord President of the Court of Session from 1811 to 1841 through his third son, David Hope was born on 27 June 1938 to Edinburgh lawyer Arthur Henry Cecil Hope, OBE, WS and Muriel Ann Neilson Hope (née Collie), and educated at Edinburgh Academy and Rugby School. He completed National Service as an officer with the Seaforth Highlanders, between 1957 and 1959, where he reached the rank lieutenant. In 1959 he commenced his studies as an Open Scholar at St John's College, Cambridge where he read Classics. He graduated with a B.A. degree in 1962. He then returned to Scotland and studied at the Faculty of Law of the University of Edinburgh, graduating LL.B. in 1965.

In 1966, Hope married Katharine Mary Kerr, daughter of solicitor Mark Kerr WS, with whom he has twin sons and a daughter.

Hope was admitted as an advocate in 1965 and became a Queen's Counsel in 1978. He served as Standing Junior Counsel in Scotland to the Board of the Inland Revenue from 1974 to 1978, and as an Advocate Depute from 1978 to 1982, prosecuting cases on behalf of the Crown. Between 1985 and 1986, he was Chairman of the Medical Appeal Tribunal and the Pensions Appeal Tribunal, and from 1986 to 1989 was Dean of the Faculty of Advocates.

The Bench and later public life
In 1989, Hope became a Senator of the College of Justice, taking the judicial title Lord Hope, and was appointed directly to the offices of Lord President of the Court of Session and Lord Justice General, Scotland's highest judge. He was made a Privy Counsellor at this time, and was awarded a Life peerage in the 1995 New Year Honours, his title being gazetted as Baron Hope of Craighead, of Bamff in the District of Perth and Kinross on 28 February 1995. In 1996, The Lord Hope of Craighead retired as Lord President to become a Lord of Appeal in Ordinary, and was succeeded by The Lord Rodger of Earlsferry. On 21 April 2009, he was appointed Second Senior Law Lord, succeeding Lord Hoffmann. On 1 October 2009, Hope became one of the first Justices of the Supreme Court of the United Kingdom, and its first Deputy President. He retired from that position on 26 June 2013.

In November 2014 it was announced that Lord Hope would be appointed as Lord High Commissioner to the General Assembly of the Church of Scotland in 2015.

Starting in 2017, Lord Hope's diaries were published in five volumes by Avizandum Publishing. The works chronicled his life and experiences, from Senior Counsel to his retirement from the Supreme Court. The later editions evoked minor controversy over remarks relating to Lady Hale's appointment to the Court, and for revealing certain information about how cases were decided behind the scenes, something one commentator described as "deeply concerning".

Hope was lauded by Iain Duncan Smith for his contribution of support in January 2021 to an amendment to the Trade Act 2021 whereby the government would be required to ensure "that the UK does not trade with genocidal regimes. Importantly, with the United Nations having shown itself incapable of making such decisions, the determination of whether genocide has taken place would be made by the High Court of England and Wales."

Notable cases
As Deputy President of the Supreme Court
R (E) v Jewish Free School [2009] UKSC 1 - discrimination in school admissions on religious grounds
R (L) v Commissioner of Police of the Metropolis [2009] UKSC 3 - criminal records checks and right to respect for private and family life
BA (Nigeria) v Secretary of State [2009] UKSC 7 - right of appeal against deportation orders
Gisda Cyf v Barratt [2010] UKSC 41 - employment contracts as against general contracts
Cadder v HM Advocate [2010] UKSC 43 - police detention of suspects
HJ and HT v Home Secretary [2010] UKSC 31 - homosexuality in asylum claims
 HM Treasury v Ahmed [2010] UKSC 2 - strikes Treasury Orders related to UNSC 1267 Committee
Jones v Kaney [2011] UKSC 13 - immunity from suit of expert witnesses
Fraser v HM Advocate [2011] UKSC 24 - role of the UK Supreme Court in Scots criminal law

As Lord of Appeal in Ordinary
R v Woollin [1999] 1 AC 82 - indirect intention
Lubbe v Cape Plc [2000] 1 WLR 1545 - tortious liability of shareholders
Bruton v London and Quadrant Housing Trust [2000] 1 AC 406 - rights of landlords and tenants
White v White [2001] 1 AC 596 - distribution of property on divorce
DGFT v First National Bank plc [2001] UKHL 52 - unfair contractual terms and the construction of unreviewable core terms
Wilson v First County Trust Ltd (No 2) [2003] UKHL 40 - impact of the Consumer Credit Act 1974 on pawnshop dealers' human rights
Campbell v Mirror Group Newspapers Ltd [2004] UKHL 22 - right to privacy and confidentiality
Chester v Afshar [2004] UKHL 41 - patients' right to give fully informed consent
Archibald v Fife Council [2004] UKHL 32 - reasonable adjustments for the disabled
Jackson v Royal Bank of Scotland [2005] UKHL 3 - remoteness
Re Spectrum Plus Ltd [2005] UKHL 41 - definition of "floating charge"
Jackson v Attorney General [2005] UKHL 56 - fox hunting ban
J & H Ritchie Ltd v Lloyd Ltd [2007] UKHL 9 - Sale of Goods Act 1979, section 35 and measure of damages for poor quality after repair
Stack v Dowden [2007] UKHL 17 - beneficial interest in the family home on divorce
The Achilleas [2008] UKHL 48 - remoteness
Austin v Commissioner of Police of the Metropolis [2009] UKHL 5 - kettling of protestors
Chartbrook Ltd v Persimmon Homes Ltd [2009] UKHL 38 - influence of pre-contractual negotiations on construction

As Lord President
Sharp v Thomson  1997 SC(HL) 66 - Scots property law
West v Secretary of State for Scotland 1992 SC 385 - Scots judicial review

As Lord Justice General
Jamieson v HM Advocate 1994 JC 88 - rape and consent
Ross v HM Advocate 1991 JC 210 - automatism

Honours & Arms
The Lord Hope of Craighead became Chancellor of the University of Strathclyde in 1998 and was appointed a Fellow in 2000. He stepped down as Chancellor in October 2013. He was awarded an honorary LL.D. by the university in 1993, and by the University of Aberdeen in 1991 and the University of Edinburgh in 1995. 

In 2007, he was awarded the David Kelbie Award by the Institute of Contemporary Scotland. He was formerly an Honorary Professor of Law at the University of Aberdeen, and is an honorary member of the Canadian Bar Association (1987) and of The Society of Legal Scholars (1991), an Honorary Fellow of the American College of Trial Lawyers (2000), and an Honorary Bencher of Gray's Inn (1989) and of the Inn of Court of Northern Ireland (1995). He is also, as of 2008, the Honorary President of the Edinburgh Student Law Review.

On St Andrew's Day, 30 November 2009, Lord Hope was appointed to the Order of the Thistle by Queen Elizabeth II. 

The Order of the Thistle is the highest chivalric honour in Scotland. In the UK as a whole it is second only to the Order of the Garter amongst chivalric orders. The order honours Scottish men and women who have held public office or who have contributed in some way to national life.

References

External links

1938 births
Living people
People educated at Edinburgh Academy
Alumni of St John's College, Cambridge
Alumni of the University of Edinburgh School of Law
People educated at Rugby School
Hope
Knights of the Thistle
Hope of Craighead
Craighead, David Hope, Baron Hope of
People associated with Perth and Kinross
People associated with the University of Strathclyde
Seaforth Highlanders officers
Members of the Judicial Committee of the Privy Council
Lords President of the Court of Session
Lords Justice-General
Hope of Craighead
Hope of Craighead
Deans of the Faculty of Advocates
Place of birth missing (living people)
Scottish King's Counsel
Crossbench life peers
20th-century King's Counsel
20th-century British Army personnel
Life peers created by Elizabeth II